This is a list of members of the South Australian House of Assembly from 1941 to 1944, as elected at the 1941 state election:

 Thebarton independent MHA Jules Langdon died on 2 November 1942. Labor candidate Fred Walsh won the resulting by-election on 12 December.
 Gouger independent MHA Albert Robinson died on 25 May 1943. Labor candidate Horace Bowden won the resulting by-election on 10 July.
 Stirling MHA Herbert Dunn had joined the LCL in 1940, but was defeated for preselection. He ran as an unendorsed LCL candidate in 1941, and sat as an LCL member on his election.
 Murray MHA Richard McKenzie was elected to his second term as an independent in 1941, but joined the Labor Party in September 1943.

Members of South Australian parliaments by term
20th-century Australian politicians